Harry Alexander Brawley (October 7, 1876 in Roxbury, Massachusetts – February 11, 1954 in Winthrop, Massachusetts) was an American track and field athlete who competed in the 1904 Summer Olympics. In 1904 he was seventh in marathon competition.

References

External links
 
 

1876 births
1954 deaths
American male long-distance runners
Olympic track and field athletes of the United States
Athletes (track and field) at the 1904 Summer Olympics
People from Roxbury, Boston
Track and field athletes from Boston
20th-century American people